The 2020–21 Chamois Niortais F.C. season was the club's 96th season in existence and its seventh consecutive season in the second flight of French football. In addition to the domestic league, Niort participated in this season's edition of the Coupe de France. The season covered the period from 1 July 2020 to 30 June 2021.

Players

First-team squad
As of 14 October 2020.

Pre-season and friendlies

Competitions

Overview

Ligue 2

League table

Results summary

Results by round

Matches
The league fixtures were announced on 9 July 2020.

Relegation play-offs

Coupe de France

References

External links

Chamois Niortais F.C. seasons
Niort